Martin van Drunen (born 1966) is a Dutch death metal vocalist who started out in the band Pestilence. In this band, he also performed the bass duties live. He recorded two albums with them, Malleus Maleficarum and Consuming Impulse. After his departure from Pestilence, van Drunen joined Asphyx as the singer and bass player in 1990 and recorded five albums in total. He performed the vocals on Comecon's second album Converging Conspiracies in 1993 and then formed his own band called Submission. In 1995, he was asked to replace Karl Willetts in the UK death metal band Bolt Thrower. He did two tours with them, but never recorded an album. 

In 2006, an "all-star" death metal band by the name Hail of Bullets was formed with van Drunen doing vocals, ex-Houwitser bass player Theo van Eekelen, Gorefest drummer Ed Warby and both Thanatos guitarists Paul Baayens and Stephan Gebédi. In May 2008, they released an album called …Of Frost and War. In 2009, van Drunen performed guest vocals on The Project Hate MCMXCIX's album The Lustrate Process. In October 2010, Hail of Bullets released their second album On Divine Winds.

Discography

With Pestilence 
 Malleus Maleficarum (1988)
 Consuming Impulse (1989)

With Asphyx 
Albums
 The Rack (1991)
 Last One on Earth (1992)
 Death...The Brutal Way (2009)
 Deathhammer (2012)
 Incoming Death (2016)
 Necroceros (2021)

EPs & Others
 Crush the Cenotaph (EP) (1992)
 Death... The Brutal Way (7" advance single) (2008)
 Live Death Doom (live DVD) (2010)

With Comecon 
 Converging Conspiracies (1993)

With Death By Dawn 
 One Hand, One Foot and a Lot of Teeth (2006)

With Hail of Bullets 
 Hail of Bullets (demo)
 …Of Frost and War (2008)
 Warsaw Rising (EP) (2009)
 On Divine Winds (2010)
 III: The Rommel Chronicles (2013)

With Grand Supreme Blood Court 
 Bow Down Before the Blood Court (2012)

References 

1966 births
Living people
Bolt Thrower members
Dutch heavy metal bass guitarists
Dutch heavy metal singers
Dutch male singers
Death metal musicians
People from Uden
Pestilence (band) members
Male bass guitarists